The siege at Hotel Delfino (Filipino: Pagkubkob sa Hotel Delfino, Ilocano: Sitio ti Hotel Delfino) in Tuguegarao, Cagayan in the Philippines, took place on March 4, 1990. A private army estimated at 300 men seized the hotel under the command of suspended Cagayan governor Rodolfo "Agi" Aguinaldo, a fierce critic of the administration of President Corazon Aquino and the Communist insurgency in the Philippines. The incident was an offshoot of the 1989 Philippine coup d'état attempt that Aguinaldo publicly supported, which led to his suspension and arrest. The standoff ended violently after several hours, leaving 14 people dead, including a high-ranking general who tried to arrest him.

Background

Rodolfo Aguinaldo
Rodolfo Aguinaldo was born in Laoag, Ilocos Norte in 1946. He graduated from the Philippine Military Academy in 1972 and served in the Philippine Constabulary (PC). During this period, he was accused of torturing dissidents during the Martial Law period in the 1970s and 1980s. Among those who positively identified him were Etta Rosales, who later became one of his colleagues in the 11th Congress of the Philippines and Chair of the Commission on Human Rights and Satur Ocampo, future representative of Bayan Muna Partylist. As one of the most active military officers involved in the counterinsurgency efforts against the Communist rebellion in the Philippines, he led an operation that led to the capture of Jose Maria Sison, leader of the Communist Party of the Philippines in La Union in 1977. In 1981, Aguinaldo was assigned to Cagayan as assistant provincial PC commander, marking the start of his association with the province.

Aguinaldo later joined the Reform the Armed Forces Movement (RAM) that was founded by alumni of the Philippine Military Academy such as Colonel Gringo Honasan, Eduardo Kapunan and Victor Batac in the early 1980s, citing disillusionment with the regime of President Ferdinand Marcos for its handling of the communist rebellion. When the 1986 EDSA People Power Revolution broke out, Aguinaldo led RAM forces in seizing control of media outlets in Quezon City from the Marcos government, paving the way for the overthrow of Marcos and the assumption of power by his rival, Corazon Aquino. For this, he was promoted to provincial PC commander in Cagayan. However, Aguinaldo and other RAM members grew disillusioned by the Aquino government's emphasis on opening negotiations with the communists and the release of Sison and other party members and dissidents. As such, Aguinaldo joined attempts by the RAM to overthrow President Aquino, starting in the coup attempt on August 28, 1987 that saw him briefly seize control of the Cagayan Valley regional military headquarters in Tuguegarao, bluntly stating later that another coup attempt would follow if the President "does not make reforms fast". Aguinaldo was stripped of his command and placed under investigation but resigned with the rank of lieutenant colonel before any significant action could be taken against him. He then ran for Governor of Cagayan in the 1988 local elections, successfully winning on a populist platform against more established rivals who were ironically supported by RAM's political patron Juan Ponce Enrile, by a landslide. During this time, he was accused of becoming a provincial warlord who built an independent economic base from logging, smuggling and gambling and used their revenues as well as defense funds and weapons caches to establish a private army of twelve hundred Negrito tribesmen and surrendered NPA guerrillas.

1989 Coup Attempt
On December 1, 1989, RAM under Col. Honasan launched its second attempt to overthrow the Aquino government. Governor Aguinaldo went on the air over DZRH in the morning, declaring support for the coup. Five hundred of his men attempted to reach Manila but were blocked in Nueva Ecija. After the coup failed, Aguinaldo was suspended as governor in January 1990 based on his radio announcement. A week before his attack on the hotel Aguinaldo was indicted on charges of rebellion and murder relating to the failed coup.

Events
Disputing both his suspension as Cagayan governor and the rebellion charges, Aguinaldo refused to surrender to authorities. Along with hundreds of armed followers, he went into hiding in his adopted hometown of Gattaran while civilian supporters tried to prevent his arrest by forming human barricades at the provincial capitol. On learning government troops were planning to attack his hideout, Aguinaldo proceeded with his troops in a convoy toward Tuguegarao on March 4. Brigadier General Oscar Florendo, Armed Forces of the Philippines chief of Civil Military Relations, and Interior Secretary Luis Santos were dispatched to Tuguegarao by President Aquino to serve Aguinaldo with an arrest warrant, but were caught off-guard by the speedy arrival of Aguinaldo's forces. After Aguinaldo's men seized control of Hotel Delfino where the general was staying, Florendo was taken hostage along with more than 50 other hotel guests while Santos managed to escape. Aguinaldo was initially receptive, holding a press conference with Gen. Florendo in the hotel lobby despite claiming to have been wounded in an ambush by government forces earlier. However gunfire erupted a few hours later at the nearby Balzain Bridge, sparking heavy fighting across the city that culminated with government troops storming the hotel. Florendo was then killed in the ensuing crossfire. The fighting left 14 people dead and wounded twenty, while Aguinaldo fled to the mountains with a militia three hundred strong.

Aftermath
Florendo's body was returned to Manila after the incident and was buried with full military honors at the Libingan ng mga Bayani on March 10. 

Aguinaldo spent the next three months in hiding until he finally surrendered at the Cagayan provincial capitol but was later released on bail. While on the run, he took responsibility for Florendo's death, calling it a ″terrible mistake″, although the actual killer of Florendo was never definitively identified. He later won reelection by a landslide in the 1992 elections, despite attempts to disqualify him from running. He was eventually acquitted of wrongdoing by the Supreme Court, which adopted a legal doctrine, later named after him, that a public official cannot be removed for administrative misconduct committed during a prior term since his re-election to office operates as a condonation of his past misconduct. The ruling was subsequently applied to similar cases involving elected officials until it was reversed by the Supreme Court in 2016. Aguinaldo stayed on as Governor until 1998, when he was elected as representative of Cagayan's 3rd congressional district, serving until his assassination in 2001 by communist rebels in Tuguegarao, shortly after losing his reelection bid.

The Hotel Delfino remains a functioning hotel run by the Ting family, members of which have served as mayors of Tuguegarao for several decades, including at the time of the siege.

In popular culture
The incident is featured, albeit with some inaccuracies, in the climax of Aguinaldo's 1993 biopic Aguinaldo: The True-to-Life Story of Gov. Rodolfo Aguinaldo of Cagayan, starring Lito Lapid as Aguinaldo and Ramil Rodriguez as an unnamed Department of the Interior and Local Government Secretary who serves as a composite of Florendo. Aguinaldo himself appears at the beginning of the film to make an opening statement and is shown taking the oath of office at the ending of the film. Some scenes were shot in Tuguegarao itself, including at the Hotel Delfino and Balzain Bridge.

References

Rebellions in the Philippines
Attempted coups in the Philippines
Presidency of Corazon Aquino
March 1990 events in Asia
History of Cagayan